Arthur St. Clair Chapman (October 28, 1912 – February 3, 1986) was a Canadian basketball player who competed in the 1936 Summer Olympics.

Born in Victoria, British Columbia, Chapman was part of the Canadian basketball team, which won the silver medal. He played all six matches including the final. He was the younger brother of Chuck Chapman, who also participated at the Berlin Games. He died in Nanaimo, British Columbia.

References

External links
profile

1912 births
1986 deaths
Basketball people from British Columbia
Basketball players at the 1936 Summer Olympics
Basketball position missing
Canadian men's basketball players
Canadian people of Scottish descent
Olympic basketball players of Canada
Olympic medalists in basketball
Olympic silver medalists for Canada
Sportspeople from Victoria, British Columbia
Medalists at the 1936 Summer Olympics